Trevor Guthrie (born February 11, 1973) is a Canadian singer, songwriter and the former lead singer of the pop group soulDecision.

Early years
Trevor Guthrie was born in North Vancouver, British Columbia. At age 3, he was playing the piano. He played his first concert at age 4. In high school at Argyle Secondary School, he began playing the guitar and writing music. He can also speak French, Spanish, and Japanese.

Music career

2000–05: soulDecision
After a name change and a new record company, MCA, the pop group Indecision emerged as soulDecision and released the single "Faded". The song became a #1 hit in Canada and a top 25 hit in the United States. The success of that single was followed by the smash hit "Ooh It's Kinda Crazy". The album No One Does It Better, which was recorded in Velvet Sound Studios in Sydney, Australia, went on to sell over a million copies. After a four-year hiatus and a label change, soulDecision released the single "Cadillac Dress". The single was a moderate radio hit. They released their second album Shady Satin Drug in November 2004. Due to a lack of support from the Canadian music industry, less than 2000 copies were printed and available for sale. Shady Satin Drug, however, spawned two more singles, "Hypnotize" and "Kiss the Walls".

2008–present: Solo career
In 2015 Guthrie released a song titled "Strong Hands", inspired by stories of World War II veterans. He is featured on Markus Schulz's track "Until It's Gone" (2012), Armin van Buuren's track "This Is What It Feels Like" (2013), R3hab's track "Soundwave" (2014), Alan Walker's track "Do It All for You" (2018), and Brennan Heart's hardstyle track "Won't Hold Me Down (Gravity)" (2018).

Discography

Singles

As solo artist

As featured artist

Awards and nominations

Grammy Awards

International Dance Music Awards

References

1973 births
Canadian male singers
Canadian pop singers
SoulDecision
Living people
People from North Vancouver
Juno Award for Dance Recording of the Year winners